A zeppola (plural: zeppole; sometimes called frittelle, and in Sardinia the italianized zippole or zeppole sarde from the original Sardinian ) is an Italian pastry consisting of a deep-fried dough ball of varying size but typically about  in diameter.  This fritter is usually topped with powdered sugar, and may be filled with custard, jelly, cannoli-style pastry cream, or a butter-and-honey mixture. The consistency ranges from light and puffy, to bread- or pasta-like. It is eaten to celebrate Saint Joseph's Day, which is a Catholic feast day.

A basic recipe for zeppole, also known as ricotta donuts, consists of one pound of ricotta cheese, two cups of enriched flour, five slightly beaten eggs, a pinch of salt, five tablespoons of sugar, four teaspoons of baking powder, and one teaspoon of vanilla. First, mix all of the ingredients in a bowl with a wooden spoon. Then, pre-heat vegetable oil on the stove at a medium temperature. Next, drop the dough, with a teaspoon, in the hot oil until it is golden brown. While it is in the oil, you should turn the pastry as it comes to the top. Then, remove the zeppole from the oil and place it onto brown paper to cool. Once the pastries are cooled, place a few of them in a brown paper bag with 10x powdered sugar. Once they are in the bag, shake the bag until all of them are evenly coated with sugar. They should be served hot but can easily be reheated at a later time.

History
Zeppole are typical of Italian cuisine, especially that of Rome and Naples. Zeppole originated in Ancient Rome when people started frying dough and putting sugar or cinnamon on it. However, the zeppole that is around today, was created in the eighteenth century. These zeppole either have sugar, cinnamon, or chocolate with them.  They are also served in Sicily, on the island of Malta, and in Italian communities in Canada and the United States. The Sardinian , even though they are often italianized to zeppole, are somewhat different. Zippulas are eaten in Sardinia to celebrate carnival. They can be seen with different ingredients and different shapes. Zippulas differ from zeppole since you use a funnel to put the dough into the oil. Zippulas then come out as different shapes due to the spiral motion used with the funnel. Zeppole are known by other names, including Bignè di San Giuseppe (in Rome), St. Joseph's Day cake, and sfinge. Zeppole are traditionally consumed during the Festa di San Giuseppe (Saint Joseph's Day) celebrated every March 19, when zeppole are sold on many streets and sometimes presented as gifts.

In Istria, Croatia, this pastry is called blenzi in the Croatian speaking places and zeppole in the Italian-speaking places. They are always topped with sugar either powdered or coarse.

The custom was popularized in the early 19th century by Neapolitan baker Pasquale Pintauro.

Varieties 

The terms zeppole and sfinge are also used to refer to baked cream puffs made from choux pastry.

Some zeppole are filled with ricotta mixed with small pieces of chocolate, candied fruits and honey.

Zeppole can also be savory, and consist of fried bread dough often filled with anchovy. In parts of Calabria, the anchovy or a sultana variety are consumed on New Year's Eve and New Year's Day. In Malta, anchovy zeppoli are traditionally consumed during the Lent fasting period. This version of savoury zeppole are known locally as sfinge. The sweet version is also available in many confectioneries.

In the province of Frosinone in southern Lazio the term sfinge refers to a mixture of ricotta, sugar and eggs with the flour, which can then be flavored with vanilla, almond, etc. It is still fried in ball shapes served covered with confectioner's sugar.

See also 

 List of pastries 
 List of custard desserts
 List of doughnut varieties
 Beignet
 Loukoumades
 Sufganiyah
 Zippuli
 Pettole

References 

Custard desserts
Italian doughnuts
Italian pastries
Neapolitan cuisine
Cuisine of Sardinia
Cuisine of Sicily
Croatian desserts
Anchovy dishes
Holiday foods
Stuffed desserts
Catholic cuisine

Cuisine of Abruzzo